Podaturpet (also Podhattoorpet or Pothatturpettai) is a Town under Pallipattu(Pallipet) Taluk in Thiruvallur district in the Indian state of Tamil Nadu.

Podaturpet is located between Tiruttani – Pallipattu(Pallipet) and Sholinghur – Nagari (Andhra pradesh) also one of the border towns of Tamilnadu - Andhra Pradesh. This Town panchayat has 18 wards. In local body elections 2022, ADMK won majority by winning 13 wards.

Demographics 
 India census, Podaturpet had a population of 22,040. Males constitute 51% of the population and females 49%. Podhaturpettai has an average literacy rate of 58%, lower than the national average of 59.5%: male literacy is 70%, and female literacy is 45%. In Podhaturpettai, 16% of the population is under 6 years of age.

Politics 

The Andhra Pradesh and Madras Alteration of Boundaries Act, enacted in 1959 by the Parliament of India under the provisions of article 3 of the constitution, went into effect from 1 April 1960. Under the act, Tiruttani taluk and Pallipattu sub-taluk of the Chittoor district of Andhra Pradesh were transferred to Madras State in exchange for territories from the Chingelput (Chengalpattu) and Salem Districts.

Tiruttani's assembly constituency is in Arakkonam (Lok Sabha constituency). It was part of Sriperumbudur (Lok Sabha constituency) earlier.

The Main Industry 
Weaving is the most important industry and is done by the majority of the people. They are engaged in handloom and powerloom, both types of weaving. The high quality knitwear woven here is distributed to all parts of the country. Next to the textile industry, agriculture is the primary occupation carried out by the majority of the population. Paddy and sugarcane are the major crops.

Temple, Church & Masjid 
Temple :

 Sivan Temple
 Ponniyamman Temple
 Dhrowpathi Amman Temple
 Murugar Temple (foot of the Hill)
 Subramani Temple
 Ucchi Pillaiyar Temple
 Nagamannam Temple
 Dhandamman Temple
 Ganagai Amma Temple
 Sithi Vinayagar Temple - Near Bus stand
 Bavani Amman
 Sengazani Ellamman Temple
 Sri Bhoo Varaharaswami(Vishnu) Temple - (West Pothatturpettai)

Church :

 CSI St. Paul's Church - Nadu Street
 St. Joseph's Church - Tiruttani road

Masjid :

 Masjid-e-Fathima

Transport 
Pothatturpettai has transport links to the nearest cities, towns and villages. Pothatturpettai has bus depot and its contains govt buses. The state of Tamil Nadu operates buses to locations including Tiruttani, Pallipattu, Sorakkaiyapettai, Tiruvallur, Poonamallee, Athimanjeripettai, R.K. Pet, Sholingur, Nagari, Walajah, Vellore, Chittoor, and Private buses Operates to Pallipattu, Tiruttani, Arakkonam, Nagari, Puttur, Narayanavanam, Arani, Arcot and Sholinghur

Near by Railway stations

 Tiruttani Railway station (Distance – 22.5KM)
 Nagari Railway station (Distance – 13.5KM)
 Ekambarakuppam Railway station (Distance – 14.5KM)
 Arakkonam Junction Railway station (Distance – 35KM)
 Sholinghur Railway station (Distance – 39KM)

Educational Institutions

Schools 

 Govt Boys higher Secondary school – Nadu street
 Govt Boys higher school – Nadu street
 Govt Elementary school – Nadu street
 Govt Girls higher Secondary – Thoppu street
 Govt Girls higher school – Thoppu street
 Govt higher school – Ponniyamman Kovil street
 P.U Middle School
 PUM School – Kudiyanavar street
 Government Middle School – Krishnanantha Street
 Panchayat Union Primary School Government
 St. Marys Matriculation School
 Vaariar Matriculation school – Podaturpet(Bommarajupet)
 TVM Nursery and Primary School
 Panchayat Union Primary School – Vanivilasapuram
 Ess(ANM) Middle school – Ponniyamman Kovil street
 Government Middle School – Ranganathan Street

Colleges 

 ESSM College of Arts and Science
 ESSM College of Education
 TVM College of Education
 TVM College (AV)
 TVM Academy of Health Science

Financial institutions 

 Indian Bank
 Karur Vysya Bank
 State Bank of India (Coming Soon)
 Indicash (ATM only)

Hospitals 

 Government Hospital
 Government Siddha Hospital
 Sri Balaji Hospital
 Rajenthiran Hospital
 E.S.S.R Hospital
 E.S.S.R. Diabetic Centre
 Sri Vinayaga Dental Clinic
 Sri Hari Clinic
 Laksharaa Skin & Hair clinic
 Bharath Eye Clinic &Opticals
 Govt. Primary Health Centre, Sorakayapet

Nearby Towns and Routes 

 Podhaturpettai to Chennai – Via Tiruttani_Tamil Nadu (23 km) – Tiruvallur_Tamil Nadu (By Bus – 60 km) – Chennai_Tamil Nadu (By Bus – 107 km)
 Podhaturpettai to Poonamallee – Via Tiruttani_Tamil Nadu (23 km) – Tiruvallur_Tamil Nadu (By Bus – 60 km) – Poonamallee_Tamil Nadu (By Bus – 87 km)
 Podhaturpettai to Tiruvallur (Dist) – Via Tiruttani_Tamil Nadu (23 km) – Kanakamma Sathram_Tamil Nadu (39 km) – Tiruvallur_Tamil Nadu (By Bus – 60 km)
 Podhaturpettai to Kanchipuram – Via Tiruttani_Tamil Nadu (23 km) – Arakkonam_Tamil Nadu (36 km) – Kancheepuram_Tamil Nadu (67 km)
 Podhaturpettai to Tirupati – Via Nagari_Andhra Pradesh (15 km) Puttur_Andhra Pradesh (30 km) – Renigunta_Andhra Pradesh (57 km) – Tirupathi_Andhra Pradesh (60 km)
 Podhaturpettai to Tirupati – Via Pallipattu_Tamil Nadu (11 km) – Karvetinagar_Andhra Pradesh (23 km) – Tirupathi_Andhra Pradesh (54 km)
 Podhaturpettai to Chittoor & Bengaluru(Bengalore) – Via Pallipattu_Tamil Nadu (11 km) – Chittoor_Andhra Pradesh (54 km) – Bengaluru_Karnataka (233 km)
 Podhaturpettai to Vellore, Ranipet & Arani Via Athimanjeripet_Tamil Nadu (9 KM) – RK Pet_Tamil Nadu (9 KM) – Sholinghur_Tamil Nadu (26 KM) – Walajapet_Tamil Nadu (48 km) – Arcot_Tamil Nadu (53 km) – Ranipet_Tamil Nadu (54 km) – Vellore_Tamil Nadu (75 km) {Sholinghur to Arni – Tamil Nadu (From Podhaturpet – 81 km})
 Nearby Major Cities

Districts :-

 Thiruvallur – TN
 Tirupati - AP
 Kanchipuram – TN
 Vellore – TN
 Ranipet – TN
 Chengalpattu – TN
 Chennai – TN(Capital of TN)
 Chittoor – AP

Towns :-

 Tiruttani
 Arakkonam
 Sholinghur
 Arcot
 Arani
 Poonamallee
 Avadi
 Walajahpet
 Kaveripakkam
 Puttur – AP
 Renigunta – AP
 Karvetinagar – AP

Town Panchayat & Villages :-

 Pallipattu (Taluk)
 Athimanjeripet
 R.K. Pet
 Sorakayapet
 B.R palli
 Ekambarakuppam – AP
 Nagari – AP
 Banavaram
 ponnai
 Pichatur  - AP
 Narayanavanam - AP

References

Cities and towns in Tiruvallur district